Maud Banks of Philadelphia, Pennsylvania was a tennis champion who played in the latter stages of the 19th century and in the early part of the 20th century.

Career
She reached the singles final of the all-comers tournament at the U.S. National Championships in 1899, a time when women played best-of-five set finals. She lost that final to Marion Jones, 1–6, 1–6, 5–7. She reached the semifinals in both singles and doubles the next year, losing to Myrtle McAteer of Pittsburgh in both matches (Banks teamed with Bessie Rastall and McAteer with Marie Wimer).

She teamed with Winona Closterman of Cincinnati to reach the doubles final at the U.S. National Championships in 1902, losing to the team of Juliette Atkinson and Marion Jones.

Banks also was a quarterfinalist at the U.S. National Championships in 1897, losing to Juliette Atkinson.

At the Cincinnati Masters, Banks reached five finals. She won the singles title in 1902 (over Closterman), and was runner-up in 1900 (falling to McAteer), won doubles titles in 1900 (with McAteer) and 1902 (with Hallie Champlin), and was a mixed doubles runner-up in 1899 (with John Hammond). The Cincinnati tournament began in 1899, making Banks one of its first champions.

Grand Slam finals

Doubles (1 runner-up)

Mixed doubles (1 runner-up)

References

Further reading
 Staff (June 25, 1902). "Miss Banks, Former Champion, Defeated by Wimer in First Round of Tennis Tourney". The Philadelphia Inquirer. 
 Paret, J. Parmley (November 1902). "Athletics for Women: No. 10—Lawn Tennis; with Illustrations Posed For by Miss Maud Banks". The Delineator. pp. 569–573

Year of death missing
19th-century American women
19th-century female tennis players
English emigrants to the United States
American female tennis players
Tennis players from Philadelphia
1879 births